Honey from the Tombs is the debut solo album by Canadian singer Amy Millan from the bands Stars and Broken Social Scene. It was released on May 30, 2006 on the Arts & Crafts record label.

Track listing
"Losin You" (2:26)
"Skinny Boy" (3:29)
"Ruby II" (1:46)
"Baby I" (3:28)
"Headsfull" (1:51)
"Wayward and Parliament" (3:30)
"Hard Hearted (Ode to Thoreau)" (3:58)
"Blue in Yr Eye" (2:49)
"Come Home Loaded Roadie" (3:58)
"All the Miles" (2:52)
"He Brings Out the Whisky in Me" (3:46)
"Pour Me Up Another" (2:59)
"Murder Train Song"* (2:03)
"She Got By"* (3:07)

 Japanese Bonus Track

External links
 https://pitchfork.com/reviews/albums/9062-honey-from-the-tombs/

2006 albums
Amy Millan albums
Arts & Crafts Productions albums